The 1967–68 Seattle SuperSonics season was the inaugural season for the expansion Seattle SuperSonics franchise in the National Basketball Association. The team's official arena was the Seattle Center Coliseum.

With a team built in its majority from the 1967 expansion draft featuring Walt Hazzard and six-year veteran Tom Meschery, and with Al Bianchi at the head coach position, the Sonics finished the season with a 23–59 record and fifth place in the Western Division, six games behind the Chicago Bulls, and did not qualify to enter the playoffs.

Draft picks

The twelve-man roster for the 1967–68 season consisted of three rookies from the 1967 NBA Draft and nine players from the expansion draft. Al Bianchi's choice of player-coach Richie Guerin from the St. Louis Hawks came as a surprise to most, since Guerin had already announced his retirement, and thus did not play for the Sonics. He would return for the 1968–69 season to play for the relocated Atlanta Hawks after Seattle traded him in the offseason. Selecting Tom Meschery from the San Francisco Warriors was made possible after the Warriors unprotected him for the draft, after Meschery informed the San Francisco front office that he desired to join the Peace Corps. Seattle's offer, however, was accepted by Meschery. The SuperSonics planned to sign former Seattle University player Charlie Williams before the start of the regular season, but league rules prohibited the Seattle franchise to offer him a contract, since Williams was expelled from college after a point shaving scandal.

Roster

Regular season

Seattle kicked off the regular season with a game against the San Francisco Warriors on October 13 at the Cow Palace, where they fell 114–116. Walt Hazzard had a high scoring debut, leading the Sonics' offense with 30 points, followed by Tom Meschery with 26. After a week off, the Sonics played in consecutive days against the other expansion franchise, the San Diego Rockets, splitting the series and thus winning their first regular season game in franchise history. After two streaks of four and eight straight losses, the Sonics found themselves quickly near the bottom of the Western Division by the end of the first four weeks of competition. A few surprising results stood out, including their only victory against Bill Russell's Boston Celtics in a double-header in Philadelphia, with the Celtics trailing by as much as 44 points after the first half, and an outstanding performance by rookie Bob Rule, with 47 points in a victory against the Los Angeles Lakers. On the other hand, the SuperSonics were on the losing end of two NBA scoring records. First, in December with a 122–160 loss against defending champions Philadelphia 76ers, that set a new NBA record for most points by a team in a quarter and a 123–154 loss against the Lakers on January that tied a franchise record for Los Angeles for most points in a game.
With six games left in the regular season the Sonics were behind two games from the Chicago Bulls in a last effort to obtain a berth in the playoffs, But in spite of defeating the Bulls in two of those six games, Chicago managed to pull away with the fourth place in the Western Division and the last spot in the playoff race, six games above the Sonics.

The SuperSonics registered an attendance of 202,263 during the regular season, the sixth best in the league in that regard. Walt Hazzard was selected to represent the West in the 1968 NBA All-Star Game and Bob Rule and Al Tucker were selected to the NBA All-Rookie First Team.

Season standings

Record vs. opponents

Game log

|- bgcolor=#fcc
| 1
| October 13
| @ San Francisco
| L 116–144
| Walt Hazzard (30)
|
|
| Oakland–Alameda County Coliseum Arena5,619
| 0–1
|- bgcolor=#fcc
| 2
| October 20
| San Diego
| L 114–121
| Walt Hazzard (32)
|
|
| Seattle Center Coliseum4,473
| 0–2
|- bgcolor=#cfc
| 3
| October 21
| @ San Diego
| W 117–110 (OT)
| Walt Hazzard (22)
|
|
| San Diego Sports Arena5,413
| 1–2
|- bgcolor=#fcc
| 4
| October 22
| Cincinnati
| L 94–106
| Walt Hazzard (27)
|
|
| Seattle Center Coliseum4,116
| 1–3
|- bgcolor=#fcc
| 5
| October 24
| Baltimore
| L 125–136
| Bob Rule (25)
|
|
| Portland, Oregon1,533
| 1–4
|- bgcolor=#fcc
| 6
| October 27
| @ Philadelphia
| L 115–132
| Bob Rule (18)
|
|
| The Spectrum4,352
| 1–5
|- bgcolor=#fcc
| 7
| October 28
| @ St. Louis
| L 109–116
| Tommy Kron (21)
|
|
| Kiel Auditorium5,218
| 1–6
|- bgcolor=#cfc
| 8
| October 31
| Chicago
| W 114–104
| Walt Hazzard (34)
|
|
| Seattle Center Coliseum3,109
| 2–6

|- bgcolor=#fcc
| 9
| November 1
| San Diego
| L 125–139
| Al Tucker (23)
|
|
| Portland, Oregon2,593
| 2–7
|- bgcolor=#fcc
| 10
| November 2
| Chicago
| L 105–109
| Bob Rule (27)
|
|
| Spokane, Washington1,051
| 2–8
|- bgcolor=#fcc
| 11
| November 3
| New York
| L 100–134
| Walt Hazzard (19)
|
|
| Seattle Center Coliseum4,654
| 2–9
|- bgcolor=#fcc
| 12
| November 7
| @ San Francisco
| L 112–126
| Bob Weiss (20)
|
|
| Oakland–Alameda County Coliseum Arena3,168
| 2–10
|- bgcolor=#fcc
| 13
| November 8
| @ St. Louis
| L 96–111
| Walt Hazzard (20)
|
|
| Kiel Auditorium3,022
| 2–11
|- bgcolor=#fcc
| 14
| November 9
| Detroit
| L 118–119
| Walt Hazzard (33)
|
|
| Madison Square Garden
| 2–12
|- bgcolor=#fcc
| 15
| November 11
| @ Baltimore
| L 129–134
| Walt Hazzard (26)
|
|
| Baltimore Civic Center4,685
| 2–13
|- bgcolor=#fcc
| 16
| November 14
| Boston
| L 111–114
| Bob Weiss (29)
|
|
| Madison Square Garden
| 2–14
|- bgcolor=#cfc
| 17
| November 17
| San Diego
| W 130–124
| Walt Hazzard (30)
|
|
| Seattle Center Coliseum4,162
| 3–14
|- bgcolor=#cfc
| 18
| November 19
| Detroit
| W 132–130 (OT)
| Bob Rule (31)
|
|
| Seattle Center Coliseum4,468
| 4–14
|- bgcolor=#fcc
| 19
| November 20
| Detroit
| L 118–120
| Bob Weiss (27)
|
|
| Tacoma, Washington2,311
| 4–15
|- bgcolor=#cfc
| 20
| November 21
| L. A. Lakers
| W 137–132
| Bob Rule (47)
|
|
| Seattle Center Coliseum8,122
| 5–15
|- bgcolor=#cfc
| 21
| November 23
| Boston
| W 133–106
| Bob Rule (26)
|
|
| Philadelphia
| 6–15
|- bgcolor=#fcc
| 22
| November 25
| Cincinnati
| L 133–153
| Walt Hazzard (19)
|
|
| Cleveland, Ohio3,455
| 6–16
|- bgcolor=#fcc
| 23
| November 25
| @ New York
| L 110–111
| Walt Hazzard (21)
|
|
| Madison Square Garden9,011
| 6–17
|- bgcolor=#cfc
| 24
| November 28
| @ Chicago
| W 111–108
| Three players (20)
|
|
| Chicago Stadium1,659
| 7–17

|-bgcolor=#fcc
| 25
| December 1
| Philadelphia
| L 109–133
| Bob Rule (29)
|
|
| Boston
| 7–18
|- bgcolor=#fcc
| 26
| December 3
| St. Louis
| L 109–123
| Tom Meschery (23)
|
|
| Seattle Center Coliseum7,938
| 7–19
|- bgcolor=#fcc
| 27
| December 5
| @ San Francisco
| L 121–133
| Walt Hazzard (29)
|
|
| Oakland–Alameda County Coliseum Arena2,306
| 7–20
|- bgcolor=#fcc
| 28
| December 8
| Chicago
| L 114–115
| Walt Hazzard,Bob Rule (21)
|
|
| Seattle Center Coliseum3,835
| 7–21
|- bgcolor=#cfc
| 29
| December 10
| L. A. Lakers
| W 133–123
| Al Tucker (35)
|
|
| Seattle Center Coliseum7,006
| 8–21
|- bgcolor=#fcc
| 30
| December 12
| Philadelphia
| L 107–118
| Al Tucker (27)
|
|
| New York City
| 8–22
|- bgcolor=#cfc
| 31
| December 15
| @ Chicago
| W 122–115
| Walt Hazzard (36)
|
|
| Chicago Stadium1,686
| 9–22
|- bgcolor=#fcc
| 32
| December 17
| Philadelphia
| L 124–139
| Rod Thorn (22)
|
|
| Seattle Center Coliseum11,294
| 9–23
|- bgcolor=#fcc
| 33
| December 18
| Detroit
| L 122–140
| Rod Thorn (29)
|
|
| Tacoma, Washington1,658
| 9–24
|- bgcolor=#fcc
| 34
| December 19
| Boston
| L 114–118
| Walt Hazzard (37)
|
|
| Seattle Center Coliseum6,889
| 9–25
|- bgcolor=#fcc
| 35
| December 20
| Philadelphia
| L 122–160
| Walt Hazzard (20)
|
|
| Seattle Center Coliseum7,714
| 9–26
|- bgcolor=#cfc
| 36
| December 22
| New York
| W 120–108
| Al Tucker (31)
|
|
| Seattle Center Coliseum8,515
| 10–26
|- bgcolor=#fcc
| 37
| December 23
| @ San Francisco
| L 124–131
| Walt Hazzard (19)
|
|
| Oakland–Alameda County Coliseum Arena3,862
| 10–27
|- bgcolor=#fcc
| 38
| December 24
| San Francisco
| L 113–127
| Walt Hazzard (20)
|
|
| Seattle Center Coliseum6,226
| 10–28
|- bgcolor=#fcc
| 39
| December 25
| @ Cincinnati
| L 112–118
| Rod Thorn (26)
|
|
| Cincinnati Gardens3,323
| 10–29
|- bgcolor=#cfc
| 40
| December 26
| New York
| W 137–135
| Walt Hazzard (37)
|
|
| Philadelphia
| 11–29
|- bgcolor=#fcc
| 41
| December 28
| San Diego
| L 125–143
| Walt Hazzard (45)
|
|
| Seattle Center Coliseum5,889
| 11–30
|- bgcolor=#fcc
| 42
| December 31
| San Francisco
| L 124–126
| Walt Hazzard (26)
|
|
| Seattle Center Coliseum4,591
| 11–31

|-bgcolor=#fcc
| 43
| January 1
| St. Louis
| L 94–115
| Walt Hazzard (17)
|
|
| Seattle Center Coliseum3,604
| 11–32
|- bgcolor=#fcc
| 44
| January 5
| Boston
| L 121–128
| Bob Rule (31)
|
|
| Seattle Center Coliseum9,188
| 11–33
|- bgcolor=#cfc
| 45
| January 6
| @ San Diego
| W 122–104
| Walt Hazzard (28)
|
|
| San Diego Sports Arena6,738
| 12–33
|- bgcolor=#fcc
| 46
| January 8
| New York
| L 113–119
| Tom Meschery (24)
|
|
| Seattle Center Coliseum4,548
| 12–34
|- bgcolor=#fcc
| 47
| January 10
| @ Boston
| L 110–123
| Walt Hazzard
|
|
| Boston Garden3,701
| 12–35
|- bgcolor=#cfc
| 48
| January 15
| New York
| W 129–113
| Walt Hazzard (24)
|
|
| Boston
| 13–35
|- bgcolor=#cfc
| 49
| January 16
| Baltimore
| W 142–116
| Tom Meschery (33)
|
|
| Chicago, Illinois3,500
| 14–35
|- bgcolor=#fcc
| 50
| January 19
| @ Detroit
| L 119–133
| Walt Hazzard (41)
|
|
| Cobo Arena5,887
| 14–36
|- bgcolor=#fcc
| 51
| January 20
| @ St. Louis
| L 115–120
| Walt Hazzard (25)
|
|
| Kiel Auditorium5,118
| 14–37
|- bgcolor=#fcc
| 52
| January 21
| @ L. A. Lakers
| L 123–154
| Walt Hazzard (24)
|
|
| The Forum9,262
| 14–38
|- bgcolor=#cfc
| 53
| January 28
| Baltimore
| W 135–126
| Walt Hazzard (23)
|
|
| Tacoma, Washington3,181
| 15–38
|- bgcolor=#cfc
| 54
| January 30
| L. A. Lakers
| W 128–116
| Walt Hazzard (31)
|
|
| Seattle Center Coliseum6,262
| 16–38

|- bgcolor=#fcc
| 55
| February  1
| St. Louis
| L 110–113
| Rod Thorn (32)
|
|
| Seattle Center Coliseum5,564
| 16–39
|- bgcolor=#fcc
| 56
| February 2
| @ L. A. Lakers
| L 113–151
| Walt Hazzard,Bob Rule (17)
|
|
| The Forum12,021
| 16–40
|- bgcolor=#fcc
| 57
| February 4
| @ L. A. Lakers
| L 131–137
| Tom Meschery (28)
|
|
| The Forum7,796
| 16–41
|- bgcolor=#cfc
| 58
| February 5
| Cincinnati
| W 132–129 (OT)
| Walt Hazzard (45)
|
|
| Phoenix, Arizona4,680
| 17–41
|- bgcolor=#cfc
| 59
| February 8
| L. A. Lakers
| W 115–110
| Walt Hazzard (31)
|
|
| Seattle Center Coliseum6,526
| 18–41
|- bgcolor=#cfc
| 60
| February 11
| San Francisco
| W 146–118
| Walt Hazzard (29)
|
|
| Seattle Center Coliseum9,505
| 19–41
|- bgcolor=#fcc
| 61
| February 14
| Philadelphia
| L 125–149
| Walt Hazzard (25)
|
|
| Seattle Center Coliseum9,449
| 19–42
|- bgcolor=#fcc
| 62
| February 15
| @ Cincinnati
| L 119–132
| Walt Hazzard (31)
|
|
| Cincinnati Gardens2,306
| 19–43
|- bgcolor=#fcc
| 63
| February 16
| @ Baltimore
| L 118–147
| Walt Hazzard (30)
|
|
| Baltimore Civic Center3,748
| 19–44
|- bgcolor=#fcc
| 64
| February 17
| @ New York
| L 111–134
| Bob Weiss (22)
|
|
| Madison Square Garden13,256
| 19–45
|- bgcolor=#fcc
| 65
| February 20
| @ Philadelphia
| L 108–140
| Walt Hazzard (25)
|
|
| The Spectrum6,417
| 19–46
|- bgcolor=#fcc
| 66
| February 21
| Chicago
| L 106–108
| Walt Hazzard,Rod Thorn (25)
|
|
| Baltimore, Maryland
| 19–47
|- bgcolor=#cfc
| 67
| February 23
| @ San Diego
| W 127–122
| Walt Hazzard (31)
|
|
| San Diego Sports Arena4,834
| 20–47
|- bgcolor=#fcc
| 68
| February 24
| Boston
| L 137–141
| Walt Hazzard (38)
|
|
| Vancouver, Canada8,129
| 20–48

|- bgcolor=#fcc
| 69
| March 2
| @ L. A. Lakers
| L 121–127
| Walt Hazzard (31)
|
|
| The Forum11,335
| 20–49
|- bgcolor=#fcc
| 70
| March 3
| Cincinnati
| L 128–138
| Rod Thorn (22)
|
|
| Seattle Center Coliseum8,894
| 20–50
|- bgcolor=#fcc
| 71
| March 5
| Baltimore
| L 121–126
| Tommy Kron (27)
|
|
| Seattle Center Coliseum4,939
| 20–51
|- bgcolor=#fcc
| 72
| March 7
| St. Louis
| L 133–150
| Walt Hazzard,Rod Thorn (29)
|
|
| Portland, Oregon2,428
| 20–52
|- bgcolor=#fcc
| 73
| March 8
| Baltimore
| L 116–122
| Tom Meschery (30)
|
|
| Olympia, Washington4,012
| 20–53
|- bgcolor=#cfc
| 74
| March 9
| @ San Diego
| W 115–111
| Tom Meschery (23)
|
|
| San Diego Sports Arena6,331
| 21–53
|- bgcolor=#fcc
| 75
| March 10
| San Francisco
| L 112–118
| Al Tucker (28)
|
|
| Seattle Center Coliseum5,536
| 21–54
|- bgcolor=#fcc
| 76
| March 11
| Boston
| L 112–119
| Tom Meschery (22)
|
|
| Seattle Center Coliseum8,136
| 21–55
|- bgcolor=#fcc
| 77
| March 12
| @ Detroit
| L 123–139
| Tommy Kron (24)
|
|
| Cobo Arena5,304
| 21–56
|- bgcolor=#fcc
| 78
| March 13
| @ Cincinnati
| L 123–142
| Bob Rule (46)
|
|
| Cincinnati Gardens4,958
| 21–57
|- bgcolor=#cfc
| 79
| March 15
| @ Chicago
| W 113–101
| Walt Hazzard (21)
|
|
| Chicago Stadium3,426
| 22–57
|- bgcolor=#fcc
| 80
| March 16
| @ St. Louis
| L 106–124
| Walt Hazzard (24)
|
|
| Kiel Auditorium7,665
| 22–58
|- bgcolor=#fcc
| 81
| March 18
| Detroit
| L 82–88
| Walt Hazzard (22)
|
|
| Seattle Center Coliseum6,244
| 22–59
|- bgcolor=#cfc
| 82
| March 19
| Chicago
| W 122–104
| Walt Hazzard (36)
|
|
| Seattle Center Coliseum10,429
| 23–59

Player statistics

Awards and records
 Al Tucker and Bob Rule earned NBA All-Rookie First Team selections
 Walt Hazzard played for the West in the 1968 NBA All-Star Game held at Madison Square Garden in New York City

References

Seattle SuperSonics seasons
Seattle